IB, Ib or ib may refer to:

Organizations

Business 
 Iberia (airline) (IATA airline code)
 Information Builders, a software firm
 Interactive Brokers, an online direct-access stock brokerage firm
 International Bank (Liberia)
 International business
 Interstate Batteries
 Investment banking

Intelligence 
 FBI Intelligence Branch, the United States Federal Bureau of Investigation's branch in charge of intelligence analysis
 Intelligence Bureau (India), the domestic intelligence organization of India
 Intelligence Bureau (Pakistan), the domestic intelligence organization of Pakistan
 IB, a defunct intelligence agency within the Swedish Army involved in the IB affair

Education 
 The International Baccalaureate, a secondary education curriculum

Science and technology 
 Inclusion bodies, nuclear or cytoplasmic aggregates of stainable substances, usually proteins
 Ion beam, a type of charged particle beam
 I b or I-b, a subtype of Type I supernova; see Type Ib and Ic supernovae
 IB printing, a Technicolor concept

Computing 
 InfiniBand, a type of computer network technology
 Information behavior, a subdiscipline within the field of library and information science
 Interface Builder, a user interface design application on Mac OS X that is part of Xcode
 Invision Power Board, Internet forum software written in PHP

Medicine 
 Ibuprofen, a non-steroidal anti-inflammatory drug
 Investigator's brochure, a document summarizing pharmacological information about an investigational product

Places 
 Ib railway station, a station in the Indian Railways system
 Ib River, a river in India
 Ib Thermal Power Station, near Jharsuguda, Odisha, India
 International border
 India–Pakistan border or International Border
 Imperial Beach, California, United States
 Ingleby Barwick, a town in North Yorkshire, England

Arts and entertainment 
 Ib (video game), a 2012 video game
 The Ib Award, presented occasionally by the Danish Film Academy
 Ib, a variant of the language game Ubbi dubbi
 Ib, a fictional ancient city in H. P. Lovecraft's story "The Doom That Came to Sarnath"
 Ib, a title character of Ib and Little Christina, a Hans Christian Andersen fairy-tale

People 
 Ibrahim Hussein (artist) (1936–2009), Malaysian artist
 Ingrid Burley (born 1986), American rapper

Other uses 
 Ib (given name), a Danish male first name
 Ib (cuneiform), a common-use sign in the Epic of Gilgamesh and other cuneiform texts
 Ib, "heart", an Ancient Egyptian concept of the soul or spirit
 Intelligent building, a type of building
 Inward Bound, an Australian National University sporting event
 Itinerarium Burdigalense, the oldest known Christian itinerarium
 Issue Brief, a type of Congressional Research Service Report